The Violent Earth is a 1998 French-Australian mini series set in New Caledonia from 1888 to 1977.

Cast 

 Karina Lombard : Anna Temaru
 Claudia Karvan : Jeanne
 Claire Nebout : Hélène
 Brittany Byrnes : Young Helene
 Laure Killing : Maximilienne Sutton
 Joe Petruzzi : Vincenzo Scarpinato
 Arnaud Giovaninetti : Carlo Scarpinato
 Simone Kessell : Gabrielle
 Jay Laga'aia : Jean-Christian
 Andrew McFarlane : Tom Sutton
 Daniel Daperis : Young Tom
 Jeremy Callaghan : John Sutton
 Bernard Verley : Hippocrates
 Bill Hunter : Campbell
 Rodney Bell : François
 Manu Bennett : Wanatcha DuValier
 Martin Copping : Mr. Best
 Frank Gallacher : Father Moissan
 Mark Gerber : Roland
 Peter McCauley : Theroux
 Sally McDonald : Jill
 Andrew McKaige : Gendarme Captain
 Rosaline Nachero : Clarisse
 Peter O'Brien : Yann Chevalier
 Pierre Pudewa : Chief Pore
 Justine Saunders : Aunt Junie
 William Takaku : Magnus
 Bud Tingwell : Bishop Guiart

References

External links
The Violent Earth at Crawfords website

The Violent Earth at Australian Television

1998 Australian television series debuts
1998 Australian television series endings
1998 French television series debuts
1998 French television series endings
1990s French television miniseries
French-Australian culture
1990s Australian television miniseries